This is a list of characters in the 30 Days of Night series and its follow-ups.

Humans

Eben Olemaun
Eben Olemaun, the primary protagonist of 30 Days of Night, is the sheriff of the small town of Barrow, Alaska. When the vampires attack Barrow, Olemaun leads a small group of survivors including his wife Stella and younger brother, Jake. Eben saves the town by injecting vampire blood into his veins and uses his enhanced strength to fight the vampire elder  Vicente. Suffering the same weakness as all vampires, Eben dies and turns to ash when the sun rises.

In the sequel, Dark Days, Stella learns that there may be a way to bring Eben back. Stella exchanges proof of the existence of vampires for her husband's remains, in the hope of bringing him back from the dead. She double crosses the vampire party, blowing up a large number of them in a house, before successfully resurrecting Eben, who goes for her neck, turning her into a vampire.  The two are reunited.

They return to save the son of new Barrow sheriff Brian Kitka in 30 Days of Night: Return to Barrow.

In the 30 Days of Night film adaptation, the character's name was changed from Eben Olemaun to Eben Oleson. Eben was portrayed by American actor Josh Hartnett and in 30 Days of Night: Dark Days was portrayed by Canadian film and television actor Stephen Huszar.

Stella Olemaun
Stella Olemaun is the wife of Eben Olemaun, the sheriff of the small town of Barrow, Alaska. When the vampires attack Barrow, Stella is among a small group of survivors led by Eben.

In the sequel, Dark Days, Stella publishes a book about the events in Utqiagvik. This gets the attention of the Los Angeles vampire population. Learning that there may be a way to bring Eben back, Stella strikes a deal with a vampire named Dane. The two form a brief sexual relationship. Stella exchanges proof of the existence of vampires for her husband's remains, in the hope of bringing him back from the dead. She double crosses the vampire party, blowing up a large number of them in a house, before successfully resurrecting Eben. She is reunited with her husband, who goes for her throat (Stella's fate after her husband's resurrection is unknown).

In the 30 Days of Night film adaptation, the character's name was changed from Stella Olemaun to Stella Oleson. In the movie, she was a fire marshal in Utqiagvik and the estranged wife of sheriff Eben Oleson. During the attack, she worked with Eben to survive the month. She was portrayed by actress Melissa George. In the film adaptation of Dark Days, she was played by Kiele Sanchez.

Brian Kitka
Brian Kitka is a character from the 30 Days of Night comic series. He first appears in the second comic sequel, Return to Barrow. His brother was William "Billy" Kitka, the deputy sheriff of Barrow, Alaska from the original comic. Both Billy and the full sheriff, Eben Olemaun, were killed in the vampire attack on the town that took place there. In Return to Barrow, set three years later, Brian goes to Barrow to both become the new sheriff and to try to find answers about what really happened to the town.

Charlie Keating
Charlie Keating was the main protagonist in 30 Days of Night: Red Snow.

Vampires

Marlowe
Marlowe (alternatively spelled Marlow) is a vampire who organizes the attack on Barrow, Alaska, during the polar night in winter. His plan is to have a month of uninterrupted killing and feeding without the burden of sunlight. The premise of the story is that vampires live all over the world, hidden in the shadows and coming out at night to prey on humans. The novel Immortal Remains identified his first name as being Roderick.

Upon learning of Marlowe's plan, Vicente, the ruler of all vampires, becomes enraged at having spent decades trying to convince humans that vampires are not real only to have Marlowe's plan risk exposing them. He comes to Barrow and kills Marlowe himself before determining to eradicate all the humans in the village to eliminate potential witnesses.

The film version of Marlowe played by Danny Huston is much the same as the graphic novel, but is combined with the character of Vincente as well.

Vicente
Vicente is a character from the 30 Days of Night franchise, first appearing in the original comic. He is the husband of Lilith, and together they are referred to as the "elders". In Dark Days, Lilith claimed that they were the parents of all other vampires. However, Vicente stated that he had outlived both his "brothers and fathers". In addition to Lilith, Vicente had at least two other female vampire consorts, although Lilith seemed to be his real wife. He lived in Norway.

During the course of the original comic, Vicente was invited to witness and participate in the raid on Barrow, Alaska organized by Marlowe. Vicente was angry that Marlow would so casually arrange a situation that could destroy the cover that Vicente had helped establish over the previous thousand years, and killed him, taking command of the vampires in Utqiagvik. He decided to destroy the town by killing any other survivors of the town and breaching the Alaskan pipeline, making it look like the town had been destroyed by accident. However, Vicente's plan was defeated by Sheriff Eben Olemaun, who turned himself into a vampire and killed Vicente in hand-to-hand combat.

The plot of Dark Days and Immortal Remains centers around Lilith's plans to avenge Vicente's death on Eben's widow, Stella Olemaun. In the movie adaptation, Vicente is absent, the film's version of Marlowe has more in common with Vicente.

Lilith
Lilith is a character from the 30 Days of Night franchise, first appearing in the original comic sequel, Dark Days. She is the wife of Vicente, and together they are referred to as the "elders". She claims to be the mother of all other vampires. She was presumably named after, and could be intended to be, the mythological Lilith. She lives in the mountains of Norway.

After Vicente is killed in Barrow, Alaska by Eben Olemaun in the events of the first comic, Lilith came to Los Angeles to confront Stella Olemaun, who had become a vampire hunter. She traded the remains of Eben to Stella in return for the visual records of the vampire attack on Utqiagvik. Dark Days ended with Stella destroying the house that Lilith was in, with her fate left unsaid.

However, Lilith survived, and was a major character in the spinoff novel Immortal Remains, which dealt with her parentage and backstory as an elder.

In the film adaptation of Dark Days, she was played by Mia Kirshner.

Dane
Dane is a vampire that appears in 30 Days of Night: Dark Days and 30 Days of Night: Return to Barrow as well as the tie-in novel 30 Days of Night: Immortal Remains. He had a romantic affair with Stella and was a friend of Marlowe's. Though he joins the group of vampires preparing to attack Barrow, he did not participate in killing the humans. He's apparently killed by vampire Agent Norris when it is revealed he was Stella's former lover. The Immortal Remains novel however reveals that he somehow survived the encounter, going on to save other humans from his ilk. His character does appear in 30 Days of Night: Dark Days film, though his role greatly altered. Instead of being her lover, he becomes a temporary ally along with a group of human survivors and is killed by Norris with a shotgun.

Lilly
Lilly first appeared in 30 Days of Night unnamed as one of the 19 vampires that attacked Barrow. She was seen in the initial attack and later encountered Eben while she was feeding on a man in the street. She later laughed when Vicente killed Marlowe.

She was the main antagonist in 30 Days of Night: Red Snow where her name was revealed to be Lilly. She is the sister of Zurial.

In the film version, she is played by Abbey-May Wakefield

Zurial
The vampire brother of Lilly that appeared in 30 Days of Night: Red Snow.

Although not in the original comic, he was in the film version and was played by John Rawls.

 
IDW Publishing characters
Lists of fictional characters